The Swedish Volunteer Battalion (SFB) or the Hanko Battalion was a Swedish military unit consisting of volunteers, which participated in the siege of the Soviet naval fleet in the Battle of Hanko during the Continuation War of Finland.

References

See also
Swedish Volunteer Corps (Winter War)

Continuation War
Battalions of Sweden
Expatriate military units and formations
Soviet Union–Sweden relations
Swedish expatriates in Finland